Electoral history of Arlen Specter, former United States Senator from Pennsylvania (1981–2011), Chairman of the Senate Committees on Intelligence (1995–1997), Veterans' Affairs (1997–2001, 2001 and 2003–2005) and Judiciary (2005–2007), as well as a candidate for the 1996 Republican presidential nomination.

Originally a Democrat, Specter switched to the Republican Party in 1965 and to the Democrats again in 2009.

1960s
Philadelphia district attorney election, 1965:
 Jim Crumlish (D) (inc.) – 289,522 (46.90%)
 Arlen Specter (R) – 327,787 (53.10%)

Philadelphia mayoral election, 1967:
 James Tate (D) (inc.) – 353,326 (48.97%)
 Arlen Specter (R) – 342,578 (47.48%)
 Joseph J. Frieri (Constitution) – 9,931 (1.38%)
 Cecil B. Moore (Political Freedom Rights) – 9,031 (1.25%)
 Leonard L. Smalls (Conservative) – 6,675 (0.93%)

Philadelphia district attorney election, 1969:
 David Berger (D) – 244,544 (40.96%)
 Arlen Specter (R) (inc.) – 346,294 (58.00%)
 Richard Ash (Consumer) – 6,189 (1.04%)

1970s
Philadelphia district attorney election, 1973:
 Emmett Fitzpatrick (D) – 231,505 (53.48%)
 Arlen Specter (R) (inc.) – 201,342 (46.52%)

Republican primary for the United States Senate from Pennsylvania, 1976:
 John Heinz III – 358,715 (37.84%)
 Arlen Specter – 332,513 (35.08%)
 George R. Packard – 160,379 (16.92%)
 C. Homer Brown – 46,828 (4.94%)
 Mary E. Folts – 29,160 (3.08%)
 Francis Worley – 20,421 (2.15%)

Republican primary for Governor of Pennsylvania, 1978:
 Dick Thornburgh – 325,376 (34.55%)
 Arlen Specter – 206,802 (21.96%)
 Bob Butera – 190,653 (20.24%)
 David W. Marston – 161,813 (17.18%)
 Henry Hager – 57,119 (6.07%)

1980s
Republican primary for the United States Senate from Pennsylvania, 1980:
 Arlen Specter – 419,372 (36.40%)
 Bud Haabestad – 382,281 (33.18%)
 Edward L. Howard – 148,200 (12.86%)
 Norman Bertasavage – 52,408 (4.55%)
 Andrew J. Watson – 43,992 (3.82%)
 Warren R. Williams – 38,164 (3.31%)
 Lewis C. Richards – 36,982 (3.21%)
 Francis Worley – 30,660 (2.66%)

United States Senate election in Pennsylvania, 1980:
 Arlen Specter (R) – 2,230,404 (50.48%)
 Pete Flaherty (D) – 2,122,391 (48.04%)
 Linda Mohrbacher (Socialist Workers) – 27,229 (0.62%)
 David K. Walter (Libertarian) – 18,595 (0.42%)
 Lee Frissell (Consumer) – 16,089 (0.36%)
 Frank Kinces (Communist) – 3,334 (0.08%)

Republican primary for the United States Senate from Pennsylvania, 1986:
 Arlen Specter (inc.) – 434,623 (76.21%)
 Richard A. Stokes – 135,673 (23.79%)

United States Senate election in Pennsylvania, 1986:
 Arlen Specter (R) (inc.) – 1,906,537 (56.44%)
 Bob Edgar (D) – 1,448,219 (42.87%)
 Lance Haver (Consumer) – 23,470 (0.70%)

1990s
Republican primary for the United States Senate from Pennsylvania, 1992:
 Arlen Specter (inc.) – 683,118 (65.08%)
 Stephen F. Freind – 366,608 (34.92%)

United States Senate election in Pennsylvania, 1992:
 Arlen Specter (R) (inc.) – 2,358,125 (48.90%)
 Lynn Yeakel (D) – 2,244,966 (46.55%)
 John F. Perry (LBT) – 219,319 (4.55%)

Iowa Republican straw poll, 1995:
 Bob Dole – 2,582 (24.38%)
 Phil Gramm – 2,582 (24.38%)
 Pat Buchanan – 1,922 (18.15%)
 Lamar Alexander – 1,156 (10.91%)
 Alan Keyes – 804 (7.59%)
 Morry Taylor – 803 (7.58%)
 Richard Lugar – 466 (4.40%)
 Pete Wilson – 123 (1.16%)
 Bob Dornan – 87 (0.82%)
 Arlen Specter – 67 (0.63%)

1996 Republican presidential primaries:
 Bob Dole – 9,024,742 (58.82%)
 Pat Buchanan – 3,184,943 (20.76%)
 Steve Forbes – 1,751,187 (11.41%)
 Lamar Alexander – 495,590 (3.23%)
 Alan Keyes – 471,716 (3.08%)
 Richard Lugar – 127,111 (0.83%)
 Unpledged delegates – 123,278 (0.80%)
 Phil Gramm – 71,456 (0.47%)
 Bob Dornan – 42,140 (0.28%)
 Morry Taylor – 21,180 (0.14%)
 Charles E. Collins – 2,092 (0.01%)
 Bill Clinton* – 1,972 (0.01%)
 Susan Ducey – 1,783 (0.01%)
 Ralph Nader* – 1,537 (0.01%)
 Isabell Masters – 1,052 (0.01%)
 Mary LeTulle – 940 (0.01%)
 Colin Powell* – 655 (0.00%)
 Billy Joe Clegg – 415 (0.00%)
 Richard P. Bosa – 216 (0.00%)
 Georgiana H. Doerschuck – 154 (0.00%)
 Pat Paulsen* – 144 (0.00%)
 Richard D. Skillen – 80 (0.00%)
 Paul Steven Jensen – 73 (0.00%)
 Jimmy McMillan – 70 (0.00%)
 Jack Kemp* – 62 (0.00%)
 Tim Kalemkarian – 59 (0.00%)
 William James Flanagan – 48 (0.00%)
 Charles Levens – 44 (0.00%)
 Russell J. Fornwalt – 37 (0.00%)
 Michael S. Levinson – 35 (0.00%)
 Jack Fellure – 34 (0.00%)
 John B. Hurd – 26 (0.00%)
 Gerald J. McManus – 20 (0.00%)
 Hubert David Patty – 17 (0.00%)
 Tennie Rogers – 12 (0.00%)
 Arlen Specter* – 10 (0.00%)
 Newt Gingrich* – 4 (0.00%)

(* – write-in)

Specter withdrew from the race before first primaries and endorsed Dole.

Republican primary for the United States Senate from Pennsylvania, 1998:
 Arlen Specter (inc.) – 376,322 (67.21%)
 Larry G. Murphy – 101,120 (18.06%)
 Tom Lingenfelter – 82,168 (14.67%)
 Scattering – 328 (0.06%)

United States Senate election in Pennsylvania, 1998:
 Arlen Specter (R) (inc.) – 1,814,180 (61.34%)
 Bill Lloyd (D) – 1,028,839 (34.79%)
 Dean L. Snyder (Constitution) – 68,377 (2.31%)
 Jack Iannantuono (Libertarian) – 46,103 (1.56%)

2000s
Republican primary for the United States Senate from Pennsylvania, 2004:
 Arlen Specter (inc.) – 530,839 (50.82%)
 Pat Toomey – 513,693 (49.18%)

United States Senate election in Pennsylvania, 2004:
 Arlen Specter (R) (inc.) – 2,925,080 (52.62%)
 Joe Hoeffel (D) – 2,334,126 (41.99%)
 James N. Clymer (Constitution) – 220,056 (3.96%)
 Elizabeth Summers (Libertarian) – 79,263 (1.43%)
 Scattering – 580 (0.01%)

2010s
Democratic primary for the United States Senate from Pennsylvania, 2010
 Joe Sestak – 565,342 (53.9%)
 Arlen Specter (inc.) – 482,980 (46.1%)

References

Specter, Arlen